Ismaila is a town and Union Council in Pakistan. Ismaila may also refer to:

Ismaila Haryana, a village in Haryana, India
Ismaila Shareef, a village in Punjab, Pakistan 
Ismaila (name)